Tarwinia is an extinct genus of stem-group flea known from a single species, T. australis, from the Early Cretaceous (Aptian) Koonwarra Fossil Bed of Victoria, Australia, it is the only member of the family Tarwiniidae, and the only stem-group flea known from the Southern Hemisphere.

References 

Prehistoric invertebrates of Australia
Fleas
Prehistoric insect genera
Early Cretaceous insects